Peter Collett (8 August 1766 – 27 July 1836) was a Norwegian judge, businessman and property owner.

Peter Collett was born at Modum in Buskerud, Norway. He was the  eldest son  of landowner Peter Collett (1740–1786) and his first wife Kirstine Holmboe (1745–1768). He was a brother of Christian Ancher Collett and Anne Cathrine Collett. He grew up on his father's estate at Buskerud Manor (Buskerud Hovedgård).  From 1784 to 1785, Collett attended the Christiania Cathedral School. During 1788, he studied law at the University of Copenhagen.

In August 1794 he married vicar's daughter Eilertine Severine Bendeke (1777–1857). They were the parents of eleven childrenm including Bernt Anker Collet. He was the grandfather of Albert Collett and great-grandfather of Emil Collett.

Peter Collett  was an assessor in the diocesan court of Akershus from 1802 to 1814.  He served as a judge on the bench of  the Supreme Court of Norway from 1814 to 1830. In 1818, Collett was the delegate from  Buskerud at the coronation of  King Charles XIV John of Sweden. In 1800, he took over Buskerud Manor from his stepmother, Johanne Henrikke Ancher (1750-1818). In 1809, he bought Hassel Iron Works (Hassel Jernværk) at Skotselv in Øvre Eiker.  Collett stopped iron production in 1835.

See also
Collett family

References

1766 births
1836 deaths
People from Modum
People educated at Oslo Cathedral School
University of Copenhagen alumni
Supreme Court of Norway justices
19th-century Norwegian people
Norwegian people of English descent
Peter